Hills Farm, also known as Hunting Creek Plantation, is a historic home and farm located in Greenbush, Accomack County, Virginia. It was built in 1747. The building is a -story, five-bay, gable roofed, brick dwelling.  A one-story, wood-framed and weatherboarded wing to the east gable end of the original house was added in 1856.  The house was restored in 1942 using the conventions of the Colonial Revival style. Also on the property are a contributing smokehouse and dairy (18th century), a barn and three small sheds (before 1920), and a caretaker's cottage (1940s).

It was added to the National Register of Historic Places in 2008.

References

Houses on the National Register of Historic Places in Virginia
Colonial Revival architecture in Virginia
Houses completed in 1747
National Register of Historic Places in Accomack County, Virginia
Houses in Accomack County, Virginia
1747 establishments in Virginia